Charodi may refer to:

 Charodi, Gujarat, a village in Gujarat, India
 Charodi (community), a community from Karnataka, India